This is a list of notable people who were born, raised, or spent significant time in the U.S. state of Florida.

Business

Politics and government

Film and television

Literature

Military

Music

Science and technology

Sports

 Eli Abaev (born 1998), American-Israeli basketball player for Hapoel Be'er Sheva in the Israeli Basketball Premier League
 Jodi Appelbaum-Steinbauer (born 1956), professional tennis player
Richard Bleier (born 1987), Major League Baseball pitcher for the Boston Red Sox
 Angela Buxton (1934–2020), English tennis player
 Toney Douglas (born 1986), basketball player for Hapoel Eilat of the Israeli Basketball Premier League
David Efianayi (born 1995), basketball player in the Israeli Basketball Premier League, raised in Orlando
Ronald Green (1944–2012), American-Israeli basketball player, born in Miami Beach
Shawn Jones (born 1992), basketball player for Hapoel Haifa of the Israeli Basketball Premier League
Maurice Kemp (born 1991), basketball player in the Israeli Basketball Premier League
Cameron Long (born 1988), basketball player 	
 Dov Markus (born 1946), Israeli-American soccer player, lives in Boynton Beach
 Ed Rubinoff (born 1935), tennis player
David Schneider (born 1955), South African-Israeli tennis player
 Speedy Smith (born 1993), basketball player for Hapoel Jerusalem of the Israeli Basketball Premier League

Other

Foreign-born Floridians

See also

 List of people from Fort Lauderdale, Florida
 List of people from Jacksonville, Florida
 List of people from Miami
 List of people from Orlando, Florida
 List of people from Pensacola, Florida
 List of people from St. Petersburg
 List of people from Tampa, Florida
 List of people from Tallahassee, Florida
 List of University of Miami alumni
 List of Florida International University people
 List of Florida suffragists

References